CJIT-FM is a Canadian radio station that broadcasts a contemporary hit radio format on the frequency 106.7 FM in Lac-Mégantic, Quebec.

History

The station originally began broadcasting in 1968 as CKFL broadcasting at 1340 AM, moved to 1400 AM in 1972 and then to its current FM frequency in 2000 as CJIT.

In March 2007, Les Productions du temps perdu inc. received permission to acquire CJIT-FM from 9063-0104 Québec inc., doing business under the name of Radio Gaé-Rit Lac Mégantic. In April 2012, the station was sold to the Montréal-based Attraction Radio group.

On July 6, 2013 the station was knocked temporarily off-air as a result of the Lac-Mégantic derailment which destroyed much of the town centre but did return with coverage of the disaster.

References

External links
Official site
 

Jit
Jit
Radio stations established in 1968
1968 establishments in Quebec